The Spring Cup is an international, multi-level synchronized skating competition, held annually in Sesto San Giovanni, Italy. Held for the first time in 1995, the competition is organized by Precision Skating Milano,  Federazione Italiana Sport del Ghiaccio and sanctioned by the International Skating Union.

Medalists

Senior teams

References

External links
 Official website of the Spring Cup

Synchronized skating competitions
Figure skating in Italy
Recurring sporting events established in 1995